Codename: Kids Next Door – Operation: V.I.D.E.O.G.A.M.E. (Villains In Detention Escape Outpost Growing Amalgamation Mega Enormously) is a 2005 platform game developed by High Voltage Software and published by Global Star Software for the GameCube, Xbox, and PlayStation 2. The game is based on the American animated television series Codename: Kids Next Door, which aired from 2002 to 2008 on Cartoon Network.

Operation: V.I.D.E.O.G.A.M.E. is one of the only two video games to be solely based on Codename: Kids Next Door. The other, Operation: S.O.D.A., is a 2D platform game developed by Vicarious Visions for the Game Boy Advance.

Plot

One day, Sector V of the KND are playing a videogame, when suddenly, the Toilenator appears, and ties up everyone except for Numbuh 1, who was too distracted by a new simulator helmet Numbuh 2 designed. 

After Numbuh 1 beats him and frees the team, they inform him that the Toilenator was, in fact real, just as Numbuh 86 calls in to tell everyone the organization's greatest foes have escaped from the Arctic Base Prison, and orders Sector V to recapture the villains, and transfer them to the KND Moonbase afterwards.

First on the list is Gramma Stuffum, who has taken over the Sprinkle Puff Donut Shoppe and is filling the donuts with liver and spinach creme. Numbuh 1 makes his way though the place, confronting Gramma Stuffum and her Chuck Wagon in her new lair. After he defeats her, Numbuh 1 gets a call from Numbuh 4 informing him that the KND Treehouse is covered in snot. Numbuh 1 deduces that all the snot means the Common Cold has invaded the Treehouse, all while a mysterious person steals the engine core from the Chuck Wagon.

Arriving back at the treehouse, Numbuh 5 finds out that the Common Cold has hacked into the Treehouse Security System and turned the defences against her, so she roams through the snot infested Treehouse to try and turn off the defense grid, and free Numbuh 4.

After Numbuh 5 achieves this, the Common Cold introduces his Snot Bomber, which happens to be floating outside the treehouse. Numbuh 2 appears piloting the KND C.O.O.L.B.U.S, which he uses to chase and fight the Common Cold through the skies. Afterwards the same mysterious person appears in a jetpack and takes the power core from the Snot Bomber, causing it to plummet to the ground. 

After that ordeal, Numbuh 4 desperately needs to use the restroom, but the toilets are still clogged up with snot, so he uses ‘the toilet we never use'. Suddenly, the power goes out and one-by-one, Count Spankulot breaks into the treehouse and turns the other KND members into spank-happy vampires. Numbuh 4 discovers his team's transformation and travels through the treehouse to defeat them and return them to normal.

Once the KND are back to normal, they decide their next course of action is to catch all the hamsters to repower the treehouse. Unfortunately their recent brawl has tired them out, aside from Numbuh 3, who thinks this mission is a game, so she's assigned to catch all the hamsters throughout the treehouse and restart the power core. Once Numbuh 3 powers up the treehouse, Numbuh 1 heads off to apprehend Count Spankulot personally, and heads out through the neighborhood freeing children, defeating the Count's minions, and ultimately confronts the villain at the School Clocktower.

After Count Spankulot's defeat, Numbuh 86 reports again, stating Sector P has spotted Stickybeard and the Sweet Revenge off the coast of South Dakota. But their plan of using Numbuh 2's T.A.R.P.O.O.N to anchor a rope so Numbuh 5 may board the ship and capture the captain had to be adjusted because of Numbuh 4's curiosity of pressing buttons.

Once the new T.A.R.P.O.O.N. is built, Numbuh 2 fires it at the Sweet Revenge and Numbuh 5 slid along the T.A.R.P.O.O.N. rope to the ship.

Numbuh 5 then makes her way through the ship, defeating all of the pirates until she confronted Stickybeard in his candy treasury room. After Numbuh 5 defeats Stickybeard the mysterious person is revealed to be Numbuh 5's older sister Cree, who then proceeds to trap her under Stickybeard, take his candy cane peg leg and leave.

Later that night, Numbuh 86 informs Sector V that Knightbrace is collecting fireflies for his new 'Bug Brite' glow in the dark toothpaste. Knowing Knightbrace has to be stopped, Numbuh 3 volunteers to browse the neighborhood for fireflies. After finding and befriending one of the fireflies, she convinces it and any others to take her to the School Clocktower, where the rest are being held.

The fireflies, grateful at being freed, help the KND find the location of Knightbrace's lair, the Cavity Cave, from where Numbuh 1 fights his way pass the Dentedrones, until he finds Knightbrace in his Dental Assault Chair.

After Numbuh 1 defeats Knightbrace, Numbuh 4 finds the Toilenator has returned to try and flood the Treehouse with sewage (as he has tried to do at the beginning of the game). Numbuh 4 makes his way through the flooding treehouse, defeating the Toilenator's new henchmen, all the way to his room. When Numbuh 4 finally wins, the Toilenator is sent to the C.O.O.L.B.U.S with the other villains.

The KND begin to take off after they have checked the villains. With everyone accounted for, they blast off to the moon in the C.O.O.L.B.U.S., only to be greeted the DCFDTL's Mega-Mansion. 

But no sooner have the KND defeated them, the DCFDTL's Mega-Mansion sends out a beam which merges the villains into a giant monster dubbed the Amalgamation. In a desperate act, Sector V and Numbuh 86 activate the T.R.E.E.H.E.M.O.T.H. After the Amalgamation is defeated, an explosion destroys the creature and sends the villains flying. Later at the Moon Base, Sector V is given celebratory medals by Numbuh 86. Immediately after this, the adventure is revealed to just be a game Sector V was playing. Numbuh 1 reminds the team they need to be ready for anything. As he says this, the Toilenator arrives at the Treehouse just like in the beginning, suggesting the events in the game are going to repeat themselves in reality.

Reception

The game received generally mixed ratings, with the Gamecube and Xbox versions having overall better reception than the PS2 version. IGN rated it poorly, 4.0 out of 10, criticizing its bad camera angles and unreliable controls.

References

External links
 

2005 video games
GameCube games
PlayStation 2 games
Video games based on animated television series
Adventure games
Xbox games
Codename: Kids Next Door video games
Video games about children
Video games featuring female protagonists
High Voltage Software games
Take-Two Interactive games
Video games developed in the United States
Platform games
Cartoon Network video games
Single-player video games
Global Star Software games
3D platform games